Lieutenant Colonel William Herbert Anderson VC (29 December 1881 – 25 March 1918) was a Scottish recipient of the Victoria Cross, the highest and most prestigious award for gallantry in the face of the enemy that can be awarded to British and Commonwealth forces.

Anderson was born on 29 December 1881 to W. J. Anderson CBE, who resided at Strathairly, Largo, Fife. He was married to Gertrude Campbell.  He was educated at Fettes College.

Anderson was 36 years old and an acting lieutenant colonel in the British Army, in the 12th (S) Battalion, The Highland Light Infantry, during the First World War, and was awarded the VC for his actions on 25 March 1918 at Bois Favieres, near Maricourt, France. He died as a result of the act for which he was commended.

A novel, The Way Home, was published in 2007 about Bertie Anderson and his three brothers, all of whom were also killed in the First World War. It was written by Robin Scott-Elliot, Bertie's great-grandson. Anderson's VC is on display at the Lord Ashcroft Gallery in the Imperial War Museum.

References

Monuments to Courage (David Harvey, 1999)
The Register of the Victoria Cross (This England, 1997)
Scotland's Forgotten Valour (Graham Ross, 1995)
VCs of the First World War - Spring Offensive 1918 (Gerald Gliddon, 1997)

External links
 Burial location of William H Anderson "France"
 Medal location
 https://www.telegraph.co.uk/men/thinking-man/untold-story-parents-lost-four-sons-first-world-war/

1881 births
1918 deaths
British World War I recipients of the Victoria Cross
Highland Light Infantry officers
British military personnel killed in World War I
British Army personnel of World War I
People educated at Fettes College
Military personnel from Glasgow
Cameronians officers
Scottish accountants
British Army recipients of the Victoria Cross
20th-century Scottish businesspeople